Sargon 4 is a 1988 video game published by Spinnaker Software.

Gameplay
Sargon 4 is a game in which 107 chess games from 1851 to 1980 are included.

Reception
Roy Wagner reviewed the game for Computer Gaming World, and stated that "Sargon 4 has a long standing reputation, but that alone will not give you everything that's wanted in a program. This is not to say that Sargon 4 is not a good purchase. It is an outstanding chess playing partner, but lacks the features of the competition."

References

External links
Review in Tilt (French)

1988 video games
Chess software
Classic Mac OS games
DOS games
Spinnaker Software games
Video game sequels
Video games developed in the United States